The nottuswara  (nōṭṭusvaras, from  "note" + "swaras") are a set of 39 compositions in Carnatic music by Muthuswami Dikshitar (18th c.), who is celebrated as one among the Trinity of Carnatic music. A few other nottusvaras were added later by his disciples which adhere to the original idea and intent. Nottusvaras are notable as an interaction between the East and the West during the East India company rule, being based on Western sources, mostly simple melodies inspired by Scottish and Irish tunes. They are all composed with Sanskrit lyrics in the Western C major scale, whose pitch intervals correspond to that of the Shankarabharana raga scale in Carnatic music, or the Bilaval that of Hindustani music. Technically, the compositions are not in Shankarabharana proper, being based on simple melodies and devoid of the ornamentation (gamaka) that is characteristic of Carnatic music. On the other hand, the lyrics (sahitya) of these compositions are entirely Indian and consistent with the rest of the stotra-literature, or other songs addressed to similar deities.

Sometimes the name "nottuswara" is used to refer to other compositions based on Western notes, not necessarily by Muthuswami Dikshitar.

Violin
According to one popular account, the violin was introduced into Carnatic music by Baluswami Dikshitar (1786–1858), the younger brother of Muthuswami Dikshitar. He encountered the instrument being played by British bands in colonial Madras, and decided to learn it. The music was mostly Irish and Scottish fiddling, rather than Western classical music. After three years of lessons, he adapted the violin to Carnatic music. It is believed that Muthuswami Dikshitar composed these lyrics to aid his brother master the plain notes on the violin.

Publication history
They were first documented in print by C. P. Brown in 1833. In 1893, Manali Chinnaswamy Mudaliar published them with European notation, and in 1905, they were compiled by Subbarama Dikshitar as 'Prathamaabhyaasa pustakamu' in Telugu. In recent years, Kanniks Kannikeswaran has researched these compositions further, found the sources of a few compositions, and given several lectures.

Examples
The European songs used as basis include "Limerick", "Castilian Maid", "Lord MacDonald's Reel", "Voulez-vous Danser?", and "God Save the King".

List of Nottuswarams by Muthuswamy Dikshithar
 Anjaneyam sadaa http://www.karnatik.com/c3326.shtml 
 Chintayeham sada http://www.karnatik.com/c3328.shtml
 Dasharathe dinadayanidhe http://www.karnatik.com/c3145.shtml 
 Dinabandho dayasindho http://www.karnatik.com/c3330.shtml 
 Guruguha padapankaja http://www.karnatik.com/c3332.shtml 
 Guruguha sarasijakarapada http://www.karnatik.com/c3333.shtml 
 He maye maam http://www.karnatik.com/c3334.shtml 
 Jagadisha guruguha http://www.karnatik.com/c3335.shtml 
 Kamalasana vandita http://www.karnatik.com/c3336.shtml 
 Kanchisham ekamranayakam http://www.karnatik.com/c3337.shtml 
 Maye chitkale http://www.karnatik.com/c3338.shtml 
 Muchukundavarada tyagaraja http://www.karnatik.com/c3339.shtml 
 Pahi durge http://www.karnatik.com/c3340.shtml 
 Pahi mam janaki vallabha http://www.karnatik.com/c3341.shtml
 Pankajamukha shankarahitha http://www.karnatik.com/c3342.shtml 
 Paradevate bhava http://www.karnatik.com/c3343.shtml 
 Parvati Pate http://www.karnatik.com/c3344.shtml 
 Pitavarnam bhaje http://www.karnatik.com/c3345.shtml 
 Ramachandram rajivaksham http://www.karnatik.com/c3348.shtml 
 Ramajanardana http://www.karnatik.com/c3347.shtml 
 Shakthisahitha ganapathim http://www.karnatik.com/c3354.shtml 
 Shyamale Meenakshi http://www.karnatik.com/c3357.shtml  
 Sadashiva jaye http://www.karnatik.com/c3349.shtml
 Sakala Suravinuta http://www.karnatik.com/c3350.shtml 
 Samagana Priye http://www.karnatik.com/c2642.shtml 
 Santana Saubhagya http://www.karnatik.com/c3352.shtml  
 Santatam Pahi Mam http://www.karnatik.com/c1826.shtml 
 Shankaravara http://www.karnatik.com/c3355.shtml
 Somaskandam http://www.karnatik.com/c3358.shtml 
 Varashivabalam http://www.karnatik.com/c3363.shtml 
 Varadaraja http://www.karnatik.com/c3362.shtml
 Vagdevi Mamava http://www.karnatik.com/c3360.shtml 
 Vande meenakshi http://www.karnatik.com/c3361.shtml

Notes

References

External links
 Muthuswamy Dikshitar - nottu svara sahityas: The (Sanskrit) lyrics of all compositions
 Dikshitar and western music
 Vismaya – An Indo Celtic Musical Journey, recordings of the Sanskrit lyrics with Western music
 British Raj and Indian Classical Music: other examples of interaction

Carnatic compositions